Kurba Vela is an uninhabited Croatian island in the Adriatic Sea located southeast of Kornat.

References

Islands of the Adriatic Sea
Islands of Croatia
Uninhabited islands of Croatia